Zha or ZHA may refer to:

 Zha (surname) (查), a Chinese surname
 Zhanjiang Airport, IATA code ZHA
 Zhuang languages, ISO 639 code zha
 Zimperium Handset Alliance, an association of device vendors and carriers exchanging security-related Android information
 Zaha Hadid Architects, an international architecture and design firm founded by Zaha Hadid.

See also
 CHA (disambiguation)